John Valentine Haidt (an anglicanization of Johann Valentin Haidt) (1700–1780) was a German-born American painter and Moravian preacher in Pennsylvania.

Life
Haidt was born in Danzig, Prussia (modern day Gdańsk, Poland).
He was educated at Berlin, and studied painting at Venice, Rome, Paris, and London.

When he was 45 or 46 years old, Haidt set out on an artistic career. He immigrated to British North America in 1754. He was ordained a deacon of the Moravian Church, and evangelized.

Haidt is known for his early dramatic paintings depicting Biblical ideas, and his later portraits of Moravian church members and early leaders of Bethlehem, Pennsylvania. He died on 18 January 1780, at Bethlehem, Pennsylvania.

Paintings

Young Moravian Girl c. 1755–60 (Smithsonian American Art Museum)
Rest on the Flight into Egypt 1754–1774
Christ Before Herod 1762
Johannetta Ettwein 1754
John Ettwein 1754
Lamentation Over the Body of Christ 1758
Christ Scourged 1758
Thomas Doubting 1758

Works preserved at the Moravian Archives, Bethlehem, Pennsylvania (partial list):

 Anna Nitschmann
 Rebecca and Eliezer at the Well
 Portrait of a Young Girl
 Nativity
 Nathanael Seidel
 Georg Neisser
 Martin Mack, ca. 1757/1758
 Johann Michael Graff, ca. 1759/1760
 Andreas Anton Lawatsch, ca. 1756/1757
 The First Fruits (Erstlingsbild)
 Anna Rosina Anders, ca. 1759/1760
 Johann Arbo
 Christian G. Seidel, ca. 1756/1757
 Ferdinand Dettmers
 Leonhard Dober
 Abraham and Isaac
 Pentecost
 Father David Nitschmann
 Christian Renatus von Zinzendorf
 Johann and Susanna Nitschmann
 David Zeisberger, ca. 1761/1762
 Lindsey House Staircase, I, 1752
 Lindsey House Staircase, II, 1752
 Zinzendorf's Grand Tour, 1719-1721, bef. 1754
 The Act of Parliament, 1749, bef. 1754
 Catharina Huber
 Friedrich Cammerhoff
 August Gottlieb Spangenberg
 Friedrich Martin
 Amadeus Paul Thrane, aft. 1761
 Anna Maria Lawatsch
 Anna Mack
 Catharina Theodora Neisser
 Gottlieb Bezold (Pezold), ca. 1756/1757
 Peter Boehler
 Paul Muenster, ca. 1761
 Jesus Showing His Side Wound
 Martha Spangenberg
 Elisabeth Boehler
 Gertraud Graff
 George Burnet, ca. 1757
 Ismaiah Burnet, ca. 1757

References

External links

Biography listing at Smithsonian American Art Museum
The Painting Preacher: John Valentine Haidt by John F. Morman
Entry at Dictionary of Art Historians

1700 births
Artists from Gdańsk
1780 deaths
18th-century American painters
18th-century American male artists
American male painters
American portrait painters
Masterpiece Museum
German emigrants to the Thirteen Colonies
People from Bethlehem, Pennsylvania
Painters from Pennsylvania
Artists of the Moravian Church